Roupala sphenophyllum is a species of plant in the family Proteaceae. It is endemic to Peru.

References

Flora of Peru
sphenophyllum
Vulnerable plants
Taxonomy articles created by Polbot